Linda Winstead Jones is an American author who has written more than fifty romance books in several subgenres, including Paranormal Romance, Romance, Historical Romance, Fairy Tale Romance, and Romantic Suspense.

Biography
Jones has published many of her novels under various pseudonyms including Linda Jones, Linda Fallon and Linda Devlin. She lives in Alabama with her husband whom she has been married to for 36 years; and their youngest son.

Jones' leisure activities are retail therapy, hiking, and reading had always loved to read than loved writing. The very first time Linda figured out that she was interested in writing was when she took a creative writing class. Writing became a big part of her life. It even came in between her yoga and French classes or even when she was decorating a cake or cooking Chinese food. Jones was always a full-time wife and mother for many years, as well as a fast-food restaurant manager, a compulsive taker of classes, a real estate saleswoman, and a picture framer with her own business. It took her a while before she sat down to write her first book.

Linda Winstead Jones wrote her first novel in 1994 called Guardian Angel which was written on her kitchen table. Ever since then she has been writing novels.

Linda's September 1996 time-travel, Desperado's Gold was the winner of the Colorado Award of Excellence in the paranormal division. She was nominated for a Romantic Times Career Achievement Award for Innovative Historical Romance, and her book Someone's Been Sleeping In My Bed was nominated in their Best Historical Love and Laughter category for 1996. She's won the Colorado Romance Writers Award of Excellence twice, is a three time RITA Award finalist, and (writing as Linda Fallon) winner of the 2004 Rita for paranormal romance.

Bibliography

Series

Sinclair Connection
 Madigan's Wife (2001)
 Hot on His Trail (2001)
 Capturing Cleo (2002)
 In Bed with Boone (2002)
 Wilder Days (2003)
 Clint's Wild Ride (2003)
 On Dean's Watch (2003)

Last Chance Heroes
 Running Scared (2004)
 Truly, Madly, Dangerously (2005)
 One Major Distraction (2005)
 Lucky's Woman (2006)
 The Guardian (2006)

Stories of Columbyana

Fyne sisters
 The Sun Witch (2004)
 The Moon Witch (2005)
 The Star Witch (2006)

Children of the Sun
 Prince of Magic (2007)
 Prince of Fire (2007)
 Prince of Swords (2007)

Emperor's Bride
 Untouchable (2008)
 22 Nights (2008)
 Bride By Command (2009)

Novels
 Every Little Thing (2000)
 West Wind (2004)
 Omnibus
 Christmas Spirit (1997) (with Elaine Fox, Leigh Greenwood)
 Love Is Murder (2003) (with Rebecca Brandewyne, Maureen Child)
 Fever / Billionaire Drifter (2004) (with Beverly Bird)
 One Major Distraction / Melting Point (2005) (with Debra Cowan)
 Beyond the Dark (2005) (with Evelyn Vaughn, Karen Whiddon)
 In His Bed (2007) (with Barbara McCauley)
 Guardian / Black Sheep P.I. (2008) (with Karen Whiddon)
 Romancing the Crown (2008) (with Marie Ferrarella)
 Sweet Dreams in The Magical Christmas Cat (2008) (with Lora Leigh, Erin McCarthy, Nalini Singh) and Paranormal Holiday Anthology Trio (2010)

Series contributed to
 Men in Blue
 Bridger's Last Stand (1999)
 Romancing the Crown
 Secret-agent Sheikh (2002)
 Romancing the Crown
 Secret-agent Sheikh (2002)
 Family Secrets
 Fever (2004)
 Family Secrets : The Next Generation
 A Touch of the Beast (2004)
 Capturing the Crown
 The Sheikh and I (2006)
 Raintree
 Raintree: Haunted (2007)
 Raintree (omnibus) (2008) (with Beverly Barton, Linda Howard)

Sources
Fantastic Fiction. 2009. Fantastic Fiction. 7 February 2009
Alabama Bound. 2004. Alabama Bound. 2100 Park Place, Birmingham, Alabama, 35203-2974. 7 February 2009.
Linda Jones. 1998– 2009. Fictionwise.com, Ereader.com. 7 February 2009.
Linda Winstead Jones.2008 Penguin Group USA. 7 February 2009.
Meet Linda Jones. Historical Romance Writers. 2001–2009. Tara and Siren Productions. 7 February 2009.

References

External links
Linda Winstead Jones official web site.

20th-century American novelists
20th-century American women writers
21st-century American novelists
21st-century American women writers
American romantic fiction writers
American women novelists
Living people
Women romantic fiction writers
Novelists from Alabama
Year of birth missing (living people)